Trosia nigropuncta is a moth of the Megalopygidae family. It was described by Druce in 1909.

References

Moths described in 1909
Megalopygidae